Barbara Jane Tanner, known as Jane Tanner, (born 29 November 1946 in Melbourne) is an Australian children's book illustrator.

Majoring in painting and printmaking at the National Gallery School, Melbourne, she worked as a traditional artist for many years. She won the 1989 Children's Book of the Year Award: Picture Book award from the Children's Book Council, illustrating Allan Baillie's book Drac and the Gremlin.

Career
She taught school in Victoria  before becoming an illustrator. Tanner often uses soft pastels, watercolours and gouache, but is best known for her use of coloured pencils. Over 25 years Jane has created more than 13 picture books including some written by herself,  and numerous book covers.

Publications

As illustrator
The Storm Whale, written by Sarah Brennan (Allen & Unwin) (2017)
Lucy’s Cat and the Rainbow Birds, written by Anthony Hill (Penguin Books) (2007)
The Fisherman and the Theefyspray written by Paul Jennings (Penguin Books) (1994)
The Wolf, written by Margaret Barbalet (Penguin Books) (1991)
Making Lunch, written by Frances James (Macmillan) (1989)
Drac and the Gremlin, written by Allan Baillie (Penguin Books) (1988)
There’s a Sea in My Bedroom, written by Margaret Wild (Penguin Books) (1984)
Time for a Rhyme, with Marjory Gardner and Heather Philpot (Thomas Nelson) (1982)

As author/illustrator
Lily and the Fairy House (Penguin Books) (2012)
Love from Grandma" (Penguin Books) (2010)Just Jack (Penguin Books) (2008)Ride with Me (Penguin Books) (2006)Isabella’s Secret (Penguin Books) (2004)Playmates (Penguin Books) (2002)Niki’s Walk (wordless picture book, Thomas Nelson) (1987)

As editorSandy's Shadow'' by Garry Hurle (Omnibus Books) (1994)

Awards and nominations
Albert Ullin Award 2022
On Selection List, Family Award for Children's Books for "Love from Grandma" 2011
Notable book, CBC for "Love from Grandma" 2011
Cool Award - Shortlist for "Lucy's Cat and the Rainbow Birds" 2008
CBC Book Awards, Early Childhood - Shortlist for "Playmates" 2003
Christian Schools Book Award for "The Fisherman and the Theefyspray" 1998 (winner)
Wilderness Society Environment Award for "The Fisherman and the Theefyspray" 1994 (winner)
Human Rights Award 1992 for "The Wolf" (winner)
CBC Awards-Younger Readers-Shortlist for "The Wolf" 1992
Victorian Premiers Award-Shortlist for "Drac and the Gremlin" 1989
CBC Picture Book of the Year 1989 for "Drac and the Gremlin" (winner)
Kate Greenaway Medal-Shortlist for "There's a Sea in my Bedroom"1985
CBC Picture Book Award - Shortlist for "There's a Sea in my Bedroom" 1985
Frequent Shortlistings for Yabba Awards.

References

External links
 Biography @ Penguin

Australian illustrators
1946 births
Living people
Artists from Melbourne
Australian children's book illustrators
Australian women illustrators
National Gallery of Victoria Art School alumni
20th-century Australian women artists
21st-century Australian women artists